Subterinebrica magnitaeniana is a species of moth of the family Tortricidae. It is found in Pichincha Province, Ecuador.

The wingspan is about 18 mm.  The ground colour of the forewings is white with a greenish hue and black markings. The hindwings are creamish, darkening apically and with weak strigulation (fine streaks).

Etymology
The species name refers to the forewing markings and is derived from Latin magnus (meaning large) and taenia (meaning fascia).

References

Moths described in 2008
Euliini